The Polaris Flare is a filamentous gas cloud in the Milky Way which is seen in the sky in the region of the constellation Ursa Minor and around the star Polaris. The area on the sky is estimated at 50 square degrees. The range is approximately 500 light years.

See also
 List of molecules in interstellar space
 Interplanetary medium – interplanetary dust
 Interstellar medium – interstellar dust
 Intergalactic medium – Intergalactic dust
 Local Interstellar Cloud

References

Ursa Minor (constellation)
Molecular clouds
Milky Way